Areti Teza (born April 3, 1980 in Athens, Greece) is a female professional volleyball player from Greece, who was a member of the Greece women's national volleyball team. At club level, she played for Greek powerhouse Olympiacos Piraeus from 2012 to 2017 and she currently plays for Artemis Korydallou.

Sporting achievements

European Honours
CEV Women's Challenge Cup
  Runner-up: 2017 with Olympiacos S.F. Piraeus

National championships
 2003/2004  Hellenic Championship, with FO Vrilissia
 2012/2013  Hellenic Championship, with Olympiacos S.F. Piraeus
 2013/2014  Hellenic Championship, with Olympiacos S.F. Piraeus
 2014/2015  Hellenic Championship, with Olympiacos S.F. Piraeus
 2015/2016  Hellenic Championship, with Olympiacos S.F. Piraeus
 2016/2017  Hellenic Championship, with Olympiacos S.F. Piraeus

National cups
 2002/2003  Hellenic Cup, with FO Vrilissia
 2003/2004  Hellenic Cup, with FO Vrilissia
 2012/2013  Hellenic Cup, with Olympiacos S.F. Piraeus
 2013/2014  Hellenic Cup, with Olympiacos S.F. Piraeus
 2014/2015  Hellenic Cup, with Olympiacos S.F. Piraeus
 2015/2016  Hellenic Cup, with Olympiacos S.F. Piraeus
 2016/2017  Hellenic Cup, with Olympiacos S.F. Piraeus

References

External links
 profile at greekvolley.gr 
 profile at CEV web site at cev.lu
 Olympiacos Women's Volleyball team roster at CEV web site

1980 births
Living people
Olympiacos Women's Volleyball players
Greek women's volleyball players
Volleyball players from Athens
21st-century Greek women